The 2006 1000 km of Istanbul was the opening race of the 2006 Le Mans Series season run by the ACO.  It was run on April 9, 2006.

Due to a mistake made by event organizers, not enough fuel was brought to Istanbul to be able to supply all the entrants for a distance of 1000 km.  Thus, the race was quickly shortened to a 4-hour timed race in order to ensure that there would be enough fuel for everyone.

Official results

Class winners in bold.  Cars failing to complete 70% of winner's distance marked as Not Classified (NC).

Statistics
 Pole Position - #17 Pescarolo Sport - 1:40.266
 Fastest Lap - #17 Pescarolo Sport - 1:41.281
 Distance - 715.292 km
 Average Speed - 177.588 km/h

References

I
2006 in Turkish motorsport